Cnephasia asiatica is a species of moth of the family Tortricidae. It is found in Turkmenistan and Turkey.

References

Moths described in 1956
asiatica
Moths of Asia